Tikur Abay Transport is an Ethiopian football club, in the city of Dessie, Amhara Region.  They play in the Ethiopian Premier League, the top level of professional football in Ethiopia. 

Football clubs in Ethiopia